Edwin Scharff (21 March 1887 – 18 May 1955) was a German sculptor. He was born in Neu-Ulm and died in Hamburg.

Biography
Scharff attended the Kunstgewerbeschule (1902–03) in Munich and studied painting at the Akademie der Bildenden Künste from 1904 to 1907. He lived in Paris between 1912 and 1913, where he was influenced by the work of Aristide Maillol and Auguste Rodin. After serving in the German army during World War One, where he was badly wounded, he became a professor of sculpture at the Vereinigte Staatsschulen für Freie und Angewandte Kunst, Berlin (1923). He was removed by the Nazis in 1933, after which he found a position at the Kunstakademie in Düsseldorf (1934–1937).

In 1928 he won a bronze medal in the art competitions of the Olympic Games for his "Médaille pour les Jeux Olympiques" ("Olympic medals"). For the Reich's Exhibition of 1937 in Düsseldorf he produced two large equestrian statues for the fair's portals, which resulted in Scharff being classified as a degenerate artist. He continued to work in secret during World War Two, and after the war he became a professor at the Landeskunstschule in Hamburg.

Legacy
In 1955, the city of Hamburg created Edwin Scharff Prize, which is awarded annually to an artist that has influenced the cultural life of the city.

References

Further reading
 Edwin Scharff, with introduction by Gottfried Sello, Hamburg, Claassen 1956
 Ausstellungskatalog Edwin Scharff: catalogue for the exhibition in the Kestner-Gesellschaft Hannover from 27 September to 4 November 1962, Städtische Kunsthalle Mannheim 1962/63, Städtisches Karl-Ernst-Osthaus-Museum Hagen 1963, Kunsthalle zu Kiel 1963, Städtisches Kunstmuseum Duisburg 1963
 Ludger Alscher et al.: Lexikon der Kunst. Architektur, Bildende Kunst, Angewandte Kunst, Industrieformgestaltung, Kunsttheorie. Band IV, Das europäische Buch, Westberlin 1984, p. 334 f.
 Helga Jörgens, Siegfried Salzmann (eds.): Edwin Scharff. Retrospektive: Skulpturen – Gemälde – Aquarelle – Zeichnungen – Graphik. Zum 100 Geburtstag des Künstlers. Edwin Scharff Museum, Neu-Ulm; Skulpturenmuseum Glaskasten, Marl; Städtische Museen Heilbronn; Kunsthalle Bremen; Schleswig-Holsteinisches Landesmuseum, Schleswig; Bremen 1987 (exhibition catalogue)
 Helga Jörgens-Lendrum: Der Bildhauer Edwin Scharff (1887–1955). Untersuchungen zu Leben und Werk, mit einem Katalog der figürlichen Plastik, Georg August-Universität, Göttingen 1994
 Frank Raberg: Biografisches Lexikon für Ulm und Neu-Ulm 1802–2009. Süddeutsche Verlagsgesellschaft im Jan Thorbecke Verlag, Ostfildern 2010, p. 354 f.
 Helga Gutbrod, Edwin Scharff Museum Neu-Ulm (eds.): Edwin Scharff 1887–1955. ‚Form muss alles werden‘ , Wienand, Köln 2013,

External links

 Artist homepage 
 Scharff museum 
 dataOlympics profile
 Drawings in the collection of the Los Angeles County Museum of Art

1887 births
1955 deaths
People from Neu-Ulm
German sculptors
German male sculptors
Olympic bronze medalists in art competitions
20th-century sculptors
Medalists at the 1928 Summer Olympics
Olympic competitors in art competitions